The American Jewish Congress (AJCongress or AJC) is an association of American Jews organized to defend Jewish interests at home and abroad through public policy advocacy, using diplomacy, legislation, and the courts.

History
The AJCongress was founded in November 1918, and represented a "populist counterbalance to the American Jewish Committee (AJC), which was dominated by the wealthy and conservative German-Jewish establishment." It has established a "reputation for being politically liberal." It protested the Nazi regime. Post World War II, it made "its mark as an active litigant on church-state issues and civil rights". It was first proposed on August 30, 1914, by Bernard G. Richards. Leaders within the American Jewish community, consisting of Jewish, Zionist, and immigrant community organizations, convened the first AJCongress in Philadelphia's historic Independence Hall. Rabbi Stephen Samuel Wise, Felix Frankfurter, U.S. Supreme Court Justice Louis Brandeis, and others joined to lay the groundwork for a national democratic organization of Jewish leaders from all over the country, to rally for equal rights for all Americans regardless of race, religion, or national ancestry.

In addition to its stated goal of equal rights for all, it was founded to broaden Jewish leadership and to present a unified American Jewish position at the Paris Peace Conference in 1919. It became effective as a pressure group in 1928 under the leadership of Rabbi Stephen Samuel Wise, who remained the president and chief spokesperson of the AJCongress until his death in 1949. The current head of the AJCongress is Jack Rosen.

The 1930s
Throughout the 1930s, Rabbi Wise was vocal in his warnings about the dangers of Nazism. When Adolf Hitler was named Chancellor of Germany on January 30, 1933, Wise organized a mass protest rally at Madison Square Garden in New York City despite strong opposition by the German government, the U.S. State Department, and conservative Jewish organizations such as the AJC and B'nai B'rith. The AJCongress continued to organize protest rallies throughout the 1930s and 1940s. In August 1933, the AJCongress led a general boycott of German goods.

In 1934, Daniel Marks was named head of the AJCongress. He traveled to Germany and brought 5,000 Jews to America.

In 1936, the AJCongress was instrumental in establishing the World Jewish Congress (WJC). Maintaining his position as president of the AJCongress, Rabbi Wise was also elected president of the WJC. During World War II, the AJCongress acted as a liaison between the U.S. government and the WJC on issues relating to rescue attempts made on behalf of European Jews.

The 1940s and 1950s
In August 1942, Rabbi Wise received a cable from Gerhart Riegner, the WJC representative in Switzerland. Riegner reported that the Nazis had planned, and were implementing, a policy to exterminate all of European Jewry; the cable also referred specifically to the Auschwitz-Birkenau concentration camp. After the U.S. State Department confirmed the accuracy of the information in the cable, now known as the Riegner Telegram, the AJCongress convened a Joint Emergency Committee. The committee sought to coordinate the major Jewish organizations in the United States to lobby the Roosevelt administration to take increased measures rescuing European Jews.
	 
In December 1942, the AJCongress established a Planning Committee, which sought support for a variety of rescue proposals. The committee was never more than marginally successful in mobilizing American public support for rescue efforts. The most impressive of these projects was another rally at Madison Square Garden. Held on March 1, 1943, the rally drew a crowd of 70,000. Similar rallies were subsequently held in a number of cities throughout the United States.

In August 1943, Rabbi Wise met Jan Karski.

The AJCongress supported Zionism and cultural pluralism. Its leadership overlapped with that of the Zionist Organization of America (ZOA). As a result, the two organizations agreed to concentrate on different tasks during the war. The AJCongress dedicated itself to rescuing European Jews, while the ZOA worked to establish a Jewish state in Palestine. This arrangement continued after the war, although its significance decreased after the creation of the State of Israel in 1948.

The AJCongress also supported coalition politics, legislative reform, and litigation as a means of bolstering a sense of Jewish identity and community. In order to further these goals, the AJCongress created the Commission on Community Interrelations (CCI) and the Commission on Law and Social Action (CLSA). The CCI worked to use psychology and social engineering to combat prejudice and developed psychological studies to bolster anti-discrimination legislation. The CLSA, chaired by Shad Polier, was the legal arm of the AJCongress and was modeled after the Legal Defense Fund of the NAACP. The mission of CLSA was "to defend civil liberties and fight discrimination against all minority groups, based on an understanding that prejudice against any group was a threat to others." One of the earliest cases the CLSA worked on was Westminster School District v. Mendez, challenging Mexican-American segregation in California schools. The brief filed by the CLSA in this case was influential in future NAACP strategies.

The AJCongress was a pioneer in the struggle for Soviet Jewry long before it became a popular movement.

Domestically, the AJCongress was active as well in the 1940s. AJCongress lawyers successfully challenged racial and religious segregation in public schools, citing the psychological harm produced in school children. These lawyers employed civil rights and Establishment Clause arguments. Jewish judges in New York, unable to gain the support of their colleagues to end religion matching of probationers, turned to AJCongress lawyers to craft a legal strategy. The lawyers at the AJCongress proffered an employment discrimination argument, noting that judges on the court  only hired as many Jewish probation officers as there were Jewish probationers. They used this argument to file a claim with New York's State Commission Against Discrimination (SCAD), which was also the first state anti-discrimination agency in the country. This claim was partially successful in that it forced judges to hire probation officers without regard to religion, but still allowed matching based on religion.

The 1960s and 1970s
Rabbi Joachim Prinz (1902–88) was president of the AJCongress from 1958 to 1966. He served as a founding chairman of the 1963 March on Washington and spoke at that event.

The AJCongress was involved in legal proceedings that sometimes conflicted with other Jewish American organizations. In 1966, the AJCongress joined the New York Civil Liberties Union, the United Parents Associations, and the United Federation of Teachers in filing suit against provisions of the Federal Education Act, which would provide support to religious schools. Jewish day school educators and leaders in over 30 states and over 100 communities representing 330 Hebrew day schools insisted that the AJCongress did not speak for American Jews on religious or educational issues, and was viewed by some in the Jewish community as primarily a secular agency. The president of the Union of Orthodox Jewish Congregations of America (also known as the Orthodox Union), Rabbi Joseph Karasick, said that the AJCongress "speaks for itself only and is under no circumstances to be taken as representing the American Jewish community. The Union of Orthodox Jewish Congregations of America, central spokesman for this country's 3,100 Orthodox synagogues, as well as all Orthodox rabbinic bodies and every other Orthodox Jewish body, have given full support to the Federal Education Act and deem its provisions to be consonant with the principle of church-state separation."

Among their most important actions was their participation on the touristic boycott by American Jews against Mexico in 1975, while Naomi B. Levine led the lawsuit when she was executive director of the American Jewish Congress. This was a response to the impulse of Arab countries, the Soviet bloc, and Non-Aligned Movement countries to consider Zionism as racism in the context of World Conference on Women in Mexico City, and the following UN General Assembly Resolution 3379 which equated it with South Africa's Apartheid and was supported by the Mexican government at the time. Joint with other Jewish American organizations, the AJCongress announced the suspension of all their trips to Mexico on 28 November 1975, after 30 unanimous votes during an executive committee reunion.

In late 1978 New York State's prison system reached an agreement, brokered in part by AJCongress's then-assistant executive director Marc D. Stern, "to arrange ... TV dinners ... along with packaged breakfasts and disposable utensils" to those requesting kosher food while in prison.

Also in 1978, under the administration of the Cultural Council Foundation CETA Artists Project, AJC hired three photographers, Bill Aron, Arnold Cohen and Meryl Meisler to document Jewish life in all five boroughs. In addition to the photographers, puppeteers, calligraphers, actors, poets, dancers and klezmer musicians were employed.

The 1980s and 1990s
Following its heyday during the 1960s, when many of its activities coincided with the larger Civil Rights Movement, a drop-off in its membership throughout the 1980s and 1990s ensued.

In the late 1990s and into the 2000s, the AJCongress experienced the defection of a number of local chapters, including those in Boston, Philadelphia, and Los Angeles. There were disputes over ideological issues and finances. Some of those chapters have since reestablished themselves as independent non-profits focused on liberal social and community issues. Finding the AJCongress had become too conservative, members of the Los Angeles chapter, for instance, created the Progressive Jewish Alliance (PJA) in 1999. They sought to assert a Jewish interest in the campaigns for social justice in Southern California, which has the United States' second largest Jewish population. The Progressive Jewish Alliance expanded in February 2005 by opening a San Francisco Bay Area chapter.

In 1994 the AJC along with the Anti Defamation League launched a campaign demanding that the IRS revoke the tax-exempt status of the Holy Land Foundation (HLF). In December 2001, when President George Bush designated the HLF as a domestic terror organization, the HLF was the largest Muslim charity in the United States.

The AJCongress has since regrouped and is actively engaged in constitutional issues domestically and supporting Israel and challenging anti-Semitism abroad.

2000–2010
In 2004, the AJCongress led a successful effort to keep federal funds out of Catholic schools. U.S. District Judge Gladys Kessler sided with the AJCongress, which argued that federal funds were being used to pay for the teaching of Catholic values through programs such as the University of Notre Dame's Alliance for Catholic Education. AmeriCorps argued that its funding was based on a program's secular activities, not religious teachings. But Judge Kessler ruled that the religious and secular activities were not sufficiently separated or monitored.

The AJCongress suspended its activities and laid off much of its staff on July 13, 2010, because it had run out of operating funds due to losses in the Madoff scandal. It disclosed that it lost roughly $21 million of the $24 million in endowments it had invested through Bernard Madoff and his firm, money that supported the AJCongress and its programs. The endowments supported about one quarter of the AJCongress' budget, which was $6.2 million in 2006. The AJCongress had connected with Madoff through Martin and Lillian Steinberg, supporters of AJCongress and friends of Madoff who invested with him, and Madoff became a trusted advisor of AJCongress on financial matters. The AJCongress increased its investments with Madoff in 2004, after it sold its New York headquarters for $18 million in 2003, and when the Steinbergs died they left approximately $17 million to the organization, which was also invested with Madoff. While the financial losses of the endowment were crippling, others noted that the AJCongress had long been in the shadow of larger American Jewish organizations such as the AJC and the Anti-Defamation League (ADL). While the AJCongress focused on religious freedom in America, free speech, and women's rights, donors showed more interest in Israel and anti-Semitism.

While the AJCongress had a long history of fighting aid to religious schools, the effort proved to be in conflict with Orthodox Jewish communities that were very successful in attracting government funds for students. An investigation by The Jewish Daily Forward showed that each year, tens of millions of dollars in federal Pell Grants go to yeshivas, which typically focus on Talmud study rather than secular subjects. For 2010, 63 of the 152 religious institutions that received Pell Grants were Jewish, the data shows. The Jewish schools received 53% of the $84.5 million in Pell Grant money that went to religious schools in 2010. Of the top ten Pell Grant recipients in dollar terms in 2010, six were yeshivas.

2010–present
In 2012, the AJCongress spent 16.5% of its expenses on programs and services it delivered. It spent 71% on administrative expenses. In 2013, the board restructured the organization; since then, it has been working on incorporating new missions that are relevant to the times. Today, the AJCongress primarily focuses on the following challenges: strengthening the bond between the U.S. and Israel; combating domestic and global anti-Semitism; combating the BDS (Boycott, Divestment and Sanctions) movement; preventing a nuclear Iran; and promoting cooperation and trade between Israel and countries around the world.

Among its major programs are the International Mayors Conference, where the organization brings over 30 mayors from around the world to promote Israel back in their cities. Past participants include Mayor of New York City Bill de Blasio, President of Argentina Mauricio Macri, Premier of Taiwan William Lai, and former Prime Minister of Italy Matteo Renzi.

Moreover, the organization successfully fights the BDS (Boycott, Divestment and Sanctions) movement and believes that BDS is not a purely anti-Israel issue, but a human rights issue. Moreover, in order to make decision makers more accessible to the Jewish community, the organization created the 500 Club and executive briefing meetings and conference calls with the decision makers and members of the Jewish community.

The AJCongress meets regularly with global leaders in order to promote the U.S.–Israel alliance. It is a leading organization in providing informative political tools for the Jewish community. In May 2019, the AJCongress launched the "Jewish Guide to U.S Politics", a virtual resource summarizing the stances of U.S. senators and candidates in the 2020 U.S. presidential race on issues related to the American Jewish community and Israel. The AJCongress also created the Club 500, an executive speaking series which connects decision makers from around the world with members of the Jewish community via phone briefings. Past participants include U.S. Senator Ben Cardin, U.S. Ambassador to Israel David Friedman, and former IDF Major General Yaakov Amidror.

The First Amendment
The AJ Congress has been involved in hundreds of civil rights and religious freedoms cases before local and federal courts and the United States Supreme Court. Brown v. Board of Education gave the AJCongress its public entrée into the field of Constitutional defense agencies.

The group advocates for removing religious symbols from public life, and thus filed a brief against allowing public displays of the menorah during Hanukkah in County of Allegheny v. ACLU.

Charitable choice
The AJCongress monitors issues like charitable choice proposals, in which federal funds are given to faith-based institutions to provide social services that are historically the responsibility of government.

Women's issues
The AJC founded its Women's Division in 1933. It operated for approximately fifty years before it was discontinued as a separate section; the organization subsequently continued its support for women's rights and feminist perspectives under the auspices of the Commission for Women's Equality (CWE), which was established in 1984.

The CWE has turned its attention to the ethical, legal, and medical issues arising from research revealing that Ashkenazi Jewish women have higher-than-average frequencies of gene mutations predisposing them to breast and ovarian cancer. The 1996 conference, "Understanding the Genetics of Breast Cancer: Implications for Treatment, Policy and Advocacy", organized by national CWE, has been duplicated by AJCongress regions nationwide. In 2000, CWE presented "Cancer Genetics in the Ashkenazi Community", to explore medical breakthroughs since the first conference as well as new developments in genetic testing. This follow-up conference was distinctly more upbeat than its predecessor, both in terms of medical preventive measures and in regard to legislation to ensure privacy and eliminate discrimination based on testing.

In 1988, AJCongress hosted "The First International Jewish Feminist Conference: The Empowerment of Women" in Israel to address women's rights. More than 600 Jewish women from around the world attended, including former Congresswoman Bella Abzug and Betty Friedan. Some of the attendees visited the Kotel (Western Wall), Torah in hand and found that they were not allowed to pray in their fashion because of Orthodox restrictions on women wearing religious items, singing or reading Torah. A movement began, now known around the world as Women of the Wall, headed by Anat Hoffman. Polls show that in Israel "64 percent of the secular public, 53 percent of the traditional non-religious public, and 26 percent of the traditional-religious public support the group, Women of the Wall, and their quest to pray at the Kotel in their fashion. But their cause was unanimously rejected by the poll's ultra-Orthodox respondents", according to The Algemeiner.

The CWE most recently held a major women's conference in Tel Aviv, Israel, in May 2006, bringing notable women of achievement like Anne F. Lewis; Lynn Sherr, anchor for ABC's 20/20; Irshad Manji, author of The Trouble with Islam; Bettina Plevan, partner at Proskauer Rose and former head of the New York City Bar Association; and others to a weeklong discussion on women's accomplishment and success. Carole E. Handler was the CWE's most recent chair.

Interfaith
The AJCongress has participated in interfaith dialogue with the U.S. Bishops' Committee for Ecumenical and Interreligious Affairs.

Controversies

Israel Singer
In the fall of 2007, the AJCongress announced that it had retained the services of Rabbi Israel Singer, the former secretary-general of the World Jewish Congress – who left the agency after claims of financial irregularities were levied following an investigation by New York State Attorney General Eliot Spitzer and followed up by accusations from then-WJC President Edgar Bronfman about alleged theft.

Ms. magazine
On January 10, 2008, the AJCongress released an official statement critical of Ms. magazine's refusal to accept a full-page advertisement honoring three prominent Israeli women: Dorit Beinisch (then-president of the Supreme Court of Israel), Tzipi Livni (then-minister of Foreign Affairs of Israel), and Dalia Itzik (then-speaker of the Knesset). The AJCongress press release states: What other conclusion can we reach,' asked Richard Gordon, President of AJCongress, 'except that the publishers − and if the publishers are right, a significant number of Ms. Magazine readers − are so hostile to Israel that they do not even want to see an ad that says something positive about Israel?' ... 'Clearly Ms. has changed a great deal from the days when AJCongress members and leaders of the AJCongress' Commission for Women's Equality − including Betty Friedan, Bella Abzug and Ms. co-founder Letty Pogrebin − were at the forefront of the Women's Movement that led to the creation of Ms. Magazine.

Katherine Spillar, executive editor of Ms. magazine, responded to the AJCongress on Ms. magazine's website, denying an anti-Israel bias, stating that: "Ms. Magazine has been criticized for not running an ad submitted by the American Jewish Congress (AJCongress) featuring the photographs of three prominent Israeli women leaders with the statement 'This is Israel. She argued that the proposed advertisement was inconsistent with the magazine's policy to accept only "mission-driven advertisements from primarily non-profit, non-partisan organizations", suggesting that the advertisement could have been perceived "as favoring certain political parties within Israel over other parties, but also with its slogan 'This is Israel,' the ad implied that women in Israel hold equal positions of power with men." Spillar stated that the magazine had "covered the Israeli feminist movement and women leaders in Israel ... eleven times" in the last four years.

Religion and the Public Schools: A Summary of the Law
The AJCongress, which had already been publishing Religion and the Public Schools: A Summary of the Law with the name of attorney Marc D. Stern on the cover, adapted it to a "looseleaf form and expanding its distribution" in 1993. Stern served as assistant executive director of AJCongress and subsequently became general counsel of the AJC

Archives
The Western Jewish History Center, of the Judah L. Magnes Museum in Berkeley, California, has a large collection of historical records and documents from the Northern California Division of AJCongress. Additionally, the American Jewish Historical Society has a large collection related to the AJCongress. The American Jewish Historical Society (AJHS) has recently completed a National Endowment for the Humanities-funded project to process a new accretion of organizational records and create a finding aid for the additional records, photographs, and audio-visual material related to the AJCongress and its executive directors, commissions, and public relations department.

See also
Congress Weekly
Lillie Shultz

References

External links

1918 establishments in the United States
 
Jewish-American political organizations
Jewish organizations established in 1918
The Holocaust and the United States
Charities based in New York City